This page describe all the 2003 seasons of Formula Renault series.

Formula Renault 3.5L

Formula Renault 2.0L

2003 Formula Renault 2000 Masters season

2003 Championnat de France Formula Renault 2.0 season

2003 Formula Renault 2000 UK season

2003 Formula Renault 2000 UK Winter Series

2003 Formula Renault BARC season

2003 Formula Renault 2000 Italia season

2003 Formula Renault 2000 Italia Winter Series

2003 Formula Renault 2000 Germany season

2003 Formula Renault 2000 Netherlands season

2003 Formula Renault 2000 Scandinavia season

References

Renault
Formula Renault seasons